Kuri is a small village  located in the Bhopalgarh tehsil of the Jodhpur District of the State of Rajasthan in western India.

About
Kuri is a large village in the Bhopalgarh tehsil of the Jodhpur District of the State of Rajasthan, India. It is located 62 km to the east of the Jodhpur District headquarters, 13 km from Bhopalgarh and 277 km from the state capital of Jaipur

Kuri Pin code is 342606 and postal head office is Pipar Road.

Near Kuri are the cities of Pipar City, Phalodi, Bilara, and Jodhpur.

Population

According to 2011 census, the Kuri population is
Male Population 	 1675
Female Population 	 1566
Total Population 	 3241

Language
Marwari is the dominant local language and Hindi is used.

Geography
It is among the larger villages of the area:
 Tambariya Kalan (8 km)
 Bhundana (9 km)
 Malar (9 km)
 Kagal (10 km)
 Dewatra (11 km)
 Sopra (6 km)

Surrounding Kuri is:
West - Mandor tehsil
West - Jodhpur tehsil
South - Bilara tehsil
East - Kharchi (Mar.Jun) tehsil

Transportation

By Road
State highway 65 from Jodhpur
By Rail
Sathin Road railway station is the very nearby railway station to Kuri. However Mahamandir railway station is major railway station 55 km near to Kuri.

Schools in Kuri
 Shree Veer Teja Secondary School, Kuri
Government secondary school kuri

Temples in Kuri
Village is inhabited by mostly Hindus along with a few Islam followers.

 Shri Sujannathji Temple
There are many temples in the village spread across its length and breadth dedicated to  various Gods and Goddesses.
But the main temple is dedicated to a great Shiva follower, Shri Sujannathji Maharaj, located in the older heart of village. It has transformed from being just an ordinary main sanctum to full fledged place for public discussions. 
A lively place, visited by villagers occasionally.

Among other important temples are,
 Ramdev Temple
 Bhomiaji Maharaj (Near village Pond)
 Hanuman Temple
and many small chattris spread around.

Over the hill (Nathji Bhakar) located on the outskirts of the village, on Sopra-Kuri boundary, is a remarkable recently built temple dedicated to 'Gunjiya Mata' along with the cave where Shri sujannathji use to meditate.

References

External links
 India by Road: Kuri- Bhopalgarh

Villages in Jodhpur district
Jodhpur district